This is a list of named algebraic surfaces, compact complex surfaces, and families thereof, sorted according to their Kodaira dimension following Enriques–Kodaira classification.

Kodaira dimension −∞

Rational surfaces
 Projective plane

Quadric surfaces

Cone (geometry)
Cylinder
Ellipsoid
Hyperboloid
Paraboloid
Sphere
Spheroid

Rational cubic surfaces

 Cayley nodal cubic surface, a certain cubic surface with 4 nodes
 Cayley's ruled cubic surface
 Clebsch surface or Klein icosahedral surface
 Fermat cubic
 Monkey saddle
 Parabolic conoid
 Plücker's conoid
 Whitney umbrella

Rational quartic surfaces

 Châtelet surfaces
 Dupin cyclides, inversions of a cylinder, torus, or double cone in a sphere
 Gabriel's horn
 Right circular conoid
 Roman surface or Steiner surface, a realization of the real projective plane in real affine space
 Tori, surfaces of revolution generated by a circle about a coplanar axis

Other rational surfaces in space

 Boy's surface, a sextic realization of the real projective plane in real affine space
 Enneper surface, a nonic minimal surface
 Henneberg surface, a minimal surface of degree 15
 Bour's minimal surface, a surface of degree 16
 Richmond surfaces, a family of minimal surfaces of variable degree

Other families of rational surfaces

 Coble surfaces 
 Del Pezzo surfaces, surfaces with an ample anticanonical divisor
 Hirzebruch surfaces, rational ruled surfaces
 Segre surfaces, intersections of two quadrics in projective 4-space
 Unirational surfaces of characteristic 0
 Veronese surface, the Veronese embedding of the projective plane into projective 5-space
 White surfaces, the blow-up of the projective plane at  points by the linear system of degree- curves through those points
 Bordiga surfaces, the White surfaces determined by families of quartic curves

Non-rational ruled surfaces

Class VII surfaces

 Vanishing second Betti number:
 Hopf surfaces
 Inoue surfaces; several other families discovered by Inoue have also been called "Inoue surfaces"
 Positive second Betti number:
 Enoki surfaces
 Inoue–Hirzebruch surfaces
 Kato surfaces

Kodaira dimension 0

K3 surfaces

 Kummer surfaces
 Tetrahedroids, special Kummer surfaces
 Wave surface, a special tetrahedroid
 Plücker surfaces, birational to Kummer surfaces
 Weddle surfaces, birational to Kummer surfaces
 Smooth quartic surfaces
 Supersingular K3 surfaces

Enriques surfaces

 Reye congruences, the locus of lines that lie on two out of three general quadric surfaces in projective space

Abelian surfaces
 Horrocks–Mumford surfaces, surfaces of degree 10 in projective 4-space that are the zero locus of sections of the rank-two Horrocks–Mumford bundle

Other classes of dimension-0 surfaces
 Non-classical Enriques surfaces, a variation on the notion of Enriques surfaces that only exist in characteristic two
 Hyperelliptic surfaces or bielliptic surfaces; quasi-hyperelliptic surfaces are a variation of this notion that exist only in characteristics two and three
 Kodaira surfaces

Kodaira dimension 1

 Dolgachev surfaces

Kodaira dimension 2 (surfaces of general type)

 Barlow surfaces
 Beauville surfaces 
 Burniat surfaces 
 Campedelli surfaces; surfaces of general type with the same Hodge numbers as Campedelli surfaces are called numerical Campidelli surfaces
 Castelnuovo surfaces
 Catanese surfaces
 Fake projective planes or Mumford surfaces, surfaces with the same Betti numbers as projective plane but not isomorphic to it
 Fano surface of lines on a non-singular 3-fold; sometimes, this term is taken to mean del Pezzo surface
 Godeaux surfaces; surfaces of general type with the same Hodge numbers as Godeaux surfaces are called numerical Godeaux surfaces
 Horikawa surfaces
 Todorov surfaces

Families of surfaces with members in multiple classes

 Surfaces that are also Shimura varieties:
 Hilbert modular surfaces
 Humbert surfaces
 Picard modular surfaces
 Shioda modular surfaces
 Elliptic surfaces, surfaces with an elliptic fibration; quasielliptic surfaces constitute a modification this idea that occurs in finite characteristic
 Raynaud surfaces and generalized Raynaud surfaces, certain quasielliptic counterexamples to the conclusions of the Kodaira vanishing theorem
 Exceptional surfaces, surfaces whose Picard number achieve the bound set by the central Hodge number h1,1
 Kähler surfaces, complex surfaces with a Kähler metric; equivalently, surfaces for which the first Betti number b1 is even 
 Minimal surfaces, surfaces that can't be obtained from another by blowing up at a point; they have no connection with the minimal surfaces of differential geometry
 Nodal surfaces, surfaces whose only singularities are nodes
 Cayley's nodal cubic, which has 4 nodes
 Kummer surfaces, quartic surfaces with 16 nodes
 Togliatti surface, a certain quintic with 31 nodes
 Barth surfaces, referring to a certain sextic with 65 nodes and decic with 345 nodes
 Labs surface, a certain septic with 99 nodes
 Endrass surface, a certain surface of degree 8 with 168 nodes
 Sarti surface, a certain surface of degree 12 with 600 nodes
 Quotient surfaces, surfaces that are constructed as the orbit space of some other surface by the action of a finite group; examples include Kummer, Godeaux, Hopf, and Inoue surfaces
 Zariski surfaces, surfaces in finite characteristic that admit a purely inseparable dominant rational map from the projective plane

See also
 Enriques–Kodaira classification
 List of surfaces

References
 Compact Complex Surfaces by Wolf P. Barth, Klaus Hulek, Chris A.M. Peters, Antonius Van de Ven  
 Complex algebraic surfaces by Arnaud Beauville,

External links
 Mathworld has a long list of algebraic surfaces with pictures.
 Some more pictures of algebraic surfaces, especially ones with many nodes.
Pictures of algebraic surfaces by Herwig Hauser.
Free program SURFER to visualize algebraic surfaces in real-time, including a user gallery.

 
 
Algebraic surfaces